East is the fourth EP by darkwave band Ego Likeness. It was the final Compass EP to be released, marking the end of the series. The EP had a limited pressing of 300 copies and was independently released on July 3, 2012 through the band's official website.

Track listing

Personnel
Donna Lynch - vocals, lyrics, piano, synths
Steven Archer - guitar, vocals, synths, drums, programming

References

External links
 Official Site

2012 EPs
Ego Likeness albums
Self-released EPs